James Eddie Logan (born December 6, 1972) is a former American football linebacker who played six seasons in the National Football League with the Cincinnati Bengals, Houston Oilers and Seattle Seahawks. Logan played college football at Southern University and attended Opp High School in Opp, Alabama. He was also a member of the Scottish Claymores of the World League of American Football.

References

External links
Just Sports Stats

Living people
1972 births
Players of American football from Alabama
American football linebackers
African-American players of American football
Memphis Tigers football players
Cincinnati Bengals players
Houston Oilers players
Seattle Seahawks players
Scottish Claymores players
People from Covington County, Alabama
21st-century African-American sportspeople
20th-century African-American sportspeople